The Quarto Group is a global illustrated book publishing group founded in 1976. It is domiciled in the United States and listed on the London Stock Exchange.

Quarto creates and sells illustrated books for adults and children, across 50 countries and in 40 languages, through a variety of traditional and non-traditional channels. Quarto employs c.330 people in eight offices in London, Brighton, New York City, Boston, Seattle, Southern California and Hong Kong. In July 2020, its publication This Book Is Anti-Racist by Tiffany Jewell reached the Number 1 position on The New York Times bestseller list.

The group was established by co-founders Laurence Orbach and Robert Morley and was listed on the London Stock Exchange in 1986. Laurence Orbach was chairman and CEO until November 2012, when he was replaced as chairman by Tim Chadwick and Marcus Leaver as CEO.

Chuk Kin Lau, the principal shareholder, became Group CEO in July 2018. In February 2020, the Italian publisher, Giunti took a significant shareholding and Andrea Giunti joined Quarto's board of directors.

In September 2020, Chuk Kin Lau became President and Polly Powell was appointed Group CEO. In January 2022, Alison Goff was appointed new Group CEO.

History
The Quarto Group was founded by Bob Morley, Michael Jackson and Laurence Orbach in the early 1970s and was finally established as The Quarto Group in 1976. In 1986, Quarto listed on the London stock exchange.

By the late 1990s, Quarto had acquired three new imprints, Rotovision, Book Sales Inc and Rockport Publishers and founded Quarto Children's Books, Quintet and Quintessence that published art, health, lifestyle and children's books. The group expanded further in the US – with the addition of Book Sales, Rockport Publishers, Walter Foster, Creative Publishing International, Motorbooks, and more recently, Cool Springs Press. In the UK, Quarto grew by acquiring Aurum Press and then Jacqui Small in 2004. By the 2000s, The Quarto Group had increased imprints and genres, along with this, a steady increase in its share value. In August 2011, The Quarto Group acquired independent UK book publisher Frances Lincoln for £4.5 million.

In 2012, Marcus Leaver took over from Laurence Orbach as Group CEO 
By 2014, the group had started two new children's imprints: Wide Eyed Editions and Words & Pictures, and acquired Small World Creations.  In 2015 Quarto acquired Ivy Press and Ivy Kids for £1.5m and continued its expansion In 2016, Quarto acquired SmartLab and becker&mayer, a co-edition publisher based in Bellevue, WA, for $9.8 million.

Quarto sold its last two non-publishing businesses in 2017 – Books & Gifts Direct (Australia/New Zealand) and Regent Publishing Services (Hong Kong) – and is now solely focused on its core publishing expertise.

Awards
 2016 Waterstones Children's Book Prize – Illustrated Book: The Bear and the piano, by David Litchfield, published by Frances Lincoln Children’s Books.
 2017 Waterstones Children's Book Prize – Illustrated Book: There’s a tiger in the garden, by Lizzy Stewart, published by Frances Lincoln Children’s Books.
 Blue Peter Book Awards 2019, Best Book with Facts: The Colours of History, by Clive Gifford, published by QED Publishing.
 British Book Awards 2018, Rights Professional of the Year: Karine Marko, Group Director of Foreign Rights at The Quarto Group.

Controversy
Investigative research by the Financial Times found out that since 2020, Quarto has been censoring some of its books in order to allow them to be printed and sold in China. References to Taiwan, Tibet, Hong Kong, and the Chinese dissident Ai Weiwei were deleted or altered, including in the award-winning book This Book is Anti-Racist.

International publishing partnerships
The Quarto Group has launched a number of foreign-language imprints through international partnerships with foreign publishers.  These include:

Quarto Editora
The Quarto Editora imprint was launched in Brazil in 2014 through an international publishing partnership with Brasil Franchising and their publishing business Editora Nobel. Quarto Editora publishes in categories such as cookery, beauty and self-help. Nobel Editora distributes the books through its franchises and main book trade channels.

Kalimat Quarto
Kalimat Quarto was launched in 2016 as an international publishing partnership with Sharjah-based Kalimat Group. The imprint publishes books in Arabic and distributes them throughout the Middle East and North Africa.

Quarto Iberoamericana 
Announced in May 2017, Quarto Iberoamericana is Quarto's Spanish language imprint launched in partnership with Argentina-based publisher Catapulta Editores S.L. The imprint publishes 20 books a year with the first six books, launching in Autumn 2017, in adult categories such as cookery, lifestyle and spirituality. Catapulta Editores will be responsible for sales and distribution in Spain, Argentina, Chile, Uruguay, Paraguay, Bolivia, Peru and Ecuador. Quarto is expected to announce more partners to distribute the books in the rest of Latin America and North America in the near future.

Imprints
Source:

Aurum Press
becker&mayer! books
becker&mayer! kids
Book Sales
Bright Press
Burgess Lea Press
Cool Springs Press
Creative Publishing International
Epic Ink Books
Fair Winds Press
Frances Lincoln Children's Books
Global Book Publishing

Harvard Common Press
Iqon Editions
Ivy Kids
Ivy Press
Leaping Hare Press
Lincoln First Editions
Motorbooks
QED/QEB Publishing
Quarry Books
Quarto Children's Books
Quarto Publishing

Race Point Publishing
Rock Point Gift & Stationery
Rockport Publishers
small world creations
SmartLab Toys
Voyageur Press
Walter Foster
Walter Foster Jr.
Wellfleet Press
White Lion Publishing
Wide Eyed Editions
words&pictures

See also
 Books in the United States
 Books in the United Kingdom

References

External links

 Quarto Knows

1976 establishments in England
Publishing companies established in 1976
Companies based in the London Borough of Islington
Book publishing companies based in London
Companies listed on the London Stock Exchange
Book publishing companies of the United States